This is a list of recordings of Ariadne auf Naxos, an opera by Richard Strauss with a German-language libretto by Hugo von Hofmannsthal. The work was first performed at the Hoftheater in Stuttgart on 25 October 1912. A radically revised version was performed in at the Hofoper in Vienna on 4 October 1916. (All the recordings listed on this page are of the revised version.)  This list is incomplete.

Recordings

References
Notes

Opera discographies
Operas by Richard Strauss